Robert Paul Kinney (September 16, 1920 – September 2, 1985) was an American professional basketball player in the Basketball Association of America (BAA), National Basketball Association (NBA) and National Professional Basketball League (NPBL). Besides Bob, his nicknames included Hi-Pocket and Bat-em Bob. Kinney, who attended high school in San Antonio, Texas, went to college at Rice University where he was a standout on the basketball team in 1940–41 and 1941–42.

During his career at Rice, Kinney, who was an imposing ,  center and forward, was a two-time consensus All-American. He was a Second Team selection in 1941 and a First Team All-American in 1942. He joined the Fort Wayne Pistons of the National Basketball League (a precursor to the NBA) in 1945. On January 30, 1949, he was sold by the Pistons to the Boston Celtics and finished out the year with them. At the conclusion of the season, the BAA merged with some of the teams from the NBL to form the NBA. Kinney was retained for the  season, which was the NBA's first, and therefore the Celtics' first in the league. In 60 games that year, Kinney scored 667 points (11.1 ppg). Kinney's NBA career ended after that season, but he played for the Anderson Packers of the NPBL in 1950–51. In 23 games, he averaged 12.4 points. On November 19, 1950, he tied a Packers franchise record with 28 points in a 73–81 loss to the Louisville Alumnites.

BAA/NBA career statistics

Regular season

References

External links

1920 births
1985 deaths
All-American college men's basketball players
American men's basketball players
Anderson Packers players
Basketball players from San Antonio
Boston Celtics players
Centers (basketball)
Fort Wayne Pistons players
Fort Wayne Zollner Pistons players
Forwards (basketball)
People from Fort Scott, Kansas
Rice Owls men's basketball players